Veini Vehviläinen (born 13 February 1997) is a Finnish professional ice hockey goaltender. He is currently playing with JYP Jyväskylä of the Liiga. He was selected in the sixth round, 173rd overall, by the Columbus Blue Jackets in the 2018 NHL Entry Draft.

Playing career
Vehviläinen began playing as a youth within JYP Jyväskylä, playing in the junior ranks, he impressively backstopped the under 20 team in the Jr. A SM-liiga as a 16-year old in the 2013–14 season.

Vehviläinen made his professional debut in the Mestis with JYP-Akatemia in the 2014–15 season, before stepping up to the Liiga with JYP in the following 2015–16 season.

On 18 April 2017, Vehviläinen left JYP and secured a two-year contract with Oulun Kärpät.

Establishing himself as the youngest starting goaltender in the Liiga, Vehviläinen quick ascension as the Liiga's best goaltender was realised in the 2017–18 season with Kärpät. He finished second in goals against average and save percentage, finishing with 20 wins in 35 games. He helped Kärpät capture the Kanada-malja championship, posting 11 wins and 3 shutouts in 17 playoff games. He was named to the Liiga All-Star Team and captured the Urpo Ylönen trophy as the league's best goaltender.

After his selection by the Columbus Blue Jackets, 173rd overall, in the 2018 NHL Entry Draft, Vehviläinen returned to play with Oulun Kärpät for the 2018–19 season. In backstopping the league leading Oulun Kärpät, Vehviläinen continued his stellar play leading the league in GAA and SV% while also posting a Liiga best 25 wins and 6 shutouts. He helped Oulun return to the Championship finals, leading all goaltenders with a 1.47 GAA and 4 shutouts. He finished with a 11–6 record before falling to HPK.

On 4 June 2019, Vehviläinen at the conclusion of his contract with Kärpät agreed to a two-year, entry-level contract with the Columbus Blue Jackets.

With the following 2020–21 NHL season delayed due to the COVID-19 pandemic, Vehviläinen opted to continue playing in Europe after accepting a loan assignment from the Blue Jackets to play with former Finnish club, JYP Jyväskylä of the Liiga, on 8 September 2020.

With the commencement of the North American season, Vehviläinen was assigned by the Blue Jackets returning to AHL affiliate, the Cleveland Monsters. After one game with the Monsters, Vehviläinen was initially recalled by the Blue Jackets to the taxi squad before making his NHL debut in relief of Joonas Korpisalo, allowing 1 goal in the 11 minutes remaining of a 5–0 defeat to the Dallas Stars on 6 March 2021. Reassigned to the Monsters, Vehviläinen was traded by the Blue Jackets to the Toronto Maple Leafs in exchange for Mikko Lehtonen on 12 March 2021. He was immediately assigned to continue in the AHL with the Toronto Marlies. In four appearances with the Marlies, he collected 1 win.

As a free agent from the Maple Leafs, Vehviläinen halted his North American career in agreeing to sign a one-year contract with Swedish club, Brynäs IF of the Swedish Hockey League (SHL), on 26 July 2021.

Entering his second season with Brynäs IF, Vehviläinen was winless in 5 games to open the 2022–23 season, before opting to leave the club and the SHL in order to return to his original Finnish club, JYP Jyväskylä of the Liiga, by agreeing to a three-year contract on 11 September 2022.

International play

Vehviläinen represented Finland at the 2015 IIHF World U18 Championships, where played seven games, posting a 1.65 goals against average and a .949 save percentage, to backstop Team Finland to a silver medal. He was named to the 2015 IIHF World U18 Championship All-Star Team as the tournament's best goaltender.

At the 2019 IIHF World Championship Vehviläinen played one game against United States in the group stage. Finland went on to win the tournament earning Vehviläinen the gold medal.

Career statistics

Regular season and playoffs

International

Awards and honours

References

External links
 

1997 births
Living people
Brynäs IF players
Cleveland Monsters players
Columbus Blue Jackets draft picks
Columbus Blue Jackets players
Finnish ice hockey goaltenders
JYP-Akatemia players
JYP Jyväskylä players
Sportspeople from Jyväskylä
Oulun Kärpät players
Toronto Marlies players
Vaasan Sport players